Komsilga is a town and the capital of the Komsilga Department, in the Kadiogo Province of central Burkina Faso.

References

Populated places in the Centre Region (Burkina Faso)
Kadiogo Province